Jangy-Jer is a village in Batken Region of Kyrgyzstan. It is part of the Batken District. Its population was 3,168 in 2021.

References

External links 
 Satellite map at Maplandia.com

Populated places in Batken Region